This is a list of Australian produced music television shows.

Early days of music television pre-dated video clips, and included variety style series, miming series, and pop series, and with the advent of music videos, shows gave way to slickly prepackaged film clips with a host compère mixing live local acts (e.g. Countdown).  The most recent trend has been towards near and complete compère-free shows which show music videos exclusively (e.g. Rage and AMV).

Talent quests and competitions are shown in the second table below.

Music television

Music-oriented talent quests/shows 
Talent quest shows have been popular throughout Australia's television broadcasting history.  A typical format is a selection of unknown singers or musicians (as opposed to established recording artists) performing before a panel of judges who award points with the winner receiving a cash prize or a recording contract.  More recent incarnations have had the heats and eliminations running over several months with public votes included (e.g. Australian Idol).

Young Talent Time was one of Australia's longest running talent quest shows (1971–1988) and included a mix of regular in-house performers with a weekly talent competition.

See also 
Music of Australia
List of Australian television series
Beat Club was a short series of about 10 30-minute episodes which aired on SBS in 1986 each Wednesday at 6pm. Showed video clips from the 1960s German TV music show also called Beat Club. Compered by Annette Shun Wah with expert commentary by Glen A Baker. The Noise replaced this series, which Annette presented solo.

References

External links
Top 40 TV
MILESAGO – Media - Television - "Countdown"
powerhousemuseum
Countdown at Nostalgia Central
Bandstand at Nostalgia Central
Kommotion at Nostalgia Central
Go!! at Nostalgia Central
Sound Unlimited/Sounds at Nostalgia Central

Music